The U.S.–Canada Team Tournament is an internet-hosted series of team Go matches, pitting strong Dan Go players from the United States versus Canadian counterparts. The tournament is held in the "USA vs Canada Team Tournament" room of the KGS Go Server, and has been held since 2007.  Time limits are one hour of main time, plus ten periods of one-minute byoyomi, per player.

The team may be restricted to players of one sex, or mixed teams.

The First U.S.-Canada Team Tournament 
The First U.S.-Canada Team Tournament was held from October 26 to October 29, 2007.
Results:

The Second U.S.-Canada Team Tournament 
Super Go system was used in the Second U.S.-Canada Team Tournament, which was held in 2009.

Schedule and result 
The winner of each game is depicted in bold.

Cathy Li did not need to present  until team Canada won the tournament.

The First USA-Canada Women Team Tournament 
USA 1:1 Canada (2009)
Xingshuo Liu B vs Sarah Yu W, W+R
Yinli Wang B vs Amira Song W, B+R

The Third USA-Canada Mixed Team Tournament 
USA 7:8 Canada (2011)

Zhanbo Sun vs Ziyang Hu B, W+4.5
Huiren Yang vs Ryan Li, Yang+A
Dae Hyuk Ko B vs Xiandong Zhang, B+E
Lu Wang B vs Juyong Koh, B+R
Michael Chen vs Jing Yang B, W+2.5
Minshan Shou B vs William Shi, W+R
Jie Liang B vs Bill Lin, W+R
Yunzhe Zhang vs Jeffrey Fung B, B+3.5
Guochen Xie B vs Tiger Gong, W+R
Kevin Hong B vs James Sedgwick, W+8.5
Yue Zhang B vs Hank Xie, W+R
Yuan Zhou vs Hao Chen B, W+R

Yinli Wang B vs Cathy Li, W+6.5
Xingshuo Liu vs Sarah Yu, Yu+A
Chaelim Kim vs Irene Sha B, W+R

References 

International Go competitions